All of director Stanley Kubrick's films from Paths of Glory until the end of his career, except for The Shining, were nominated for Academy Awards or Golden Globe Awards, in various categories. 2001: A Space Odyssey received numerous technical awards, including a BAFTA Award for cinematographer Geoffrey Unsworth and an Academy Award for Best Visual Effects, which Kubrick (as director of special effects on the film) received. This was Kubrick's only personal Academy Award win among 13 nominations. Nominations for his films were mostly in the areas of cinematography, art design, screenwriting, and music. Only four of his films were nominated for either an Academy Award or Golden Globe Award for their acting performances: Spartacus, Lolita, Dr. Strangelove, and A Clockwork Orange.

Personal awards for Kubrick, limited to Academy Awards, British Academy Film Awards (BAFTA), Golden Globe Awards and Saturns, are as follows:

Academy Awards 
The Academy Awards, or "Oscars" are a set of awards given annually for excellence of cinematic achievements. The awards, organized by the Academy of Motion Picture Arts and Sciences (AMPAS), were first held in 1929 at the Hollywood Roosevelt Hotel. Kubrick received one award from thirteen nominations.

British Academy Film Awards 
The British Academy Film Award is an annual award show presented by the British Academy of Film and Television Arts. The awards were founded in 1947 as The British Film Academy, by David Lean, Alexander Korda, Carol Reed, Charles Laughton, Roger Manvell and others. Kubrick received three awards from eleven nominations.

|-
| 1957
| The Killing
| rowspan=4|Best Film from any Source
| 
|-
| 1958
| Paths of Glory
| 
|-
| 1961
| Spartacus
| 
|-
| rowspan=3|1965
| rowspan=3|Dr. Strangelove
| 
|-
| BAFTA Award for Best British Screenplay
| 
|-
| BAFTA Award for Best British Film
| 
|-
| 1969
| 2001: A Space Odyssey
| BAFTA Award for Best Film
| 
|-
| rowspan=2|1973
| rowspan=2|A Clockwork Orange
| BAFTA Award for Best Screenplay
| 
|-
| BAFTA Award for Best Film
| 
|-
| rowspan=2|1976
| rowspan=2|Barry Lyndon
| BAFTA Award for Best Direction
| 
|-
| BAFTA Award for Best Film
| 
|-
|colspan=4| 
|}

Golden Globe Awards 
The Golden Globe Award is an accolade bestowed by the 93 members of the Hollywood Foreign Press Association (HFPA) recognizing excellence in film and television, both domestic and foreign. Kubrick received no awards from six nominations.

|-
| 1961
| Spartacus
| rowspan=3|Golden Globe Award for Best Director
| 
|-
| 1963
| Lolita
| 
|-
| rowspan=2|1972
| rowspan=2|A Clockwork Orange
| 
|-
| Golden Globe Award for Best Motion Picture – Drama
| 
|-
| rowspan=2|1975
| rowspan=2|Barry Lyndon
|Golden Globe Award for Best Director
| 
|-
| Golden Globe Award for Best Motion Picture – Drama
| 
|}

Hugo Awards 
The Hugo Awards are a set of awards given annually for the best science fiction or fantasy works and achievements. Organized and overseen by the World Science Fiction Society, the awards are given each year at the annual World Science Fiction Convention as the central focus of the event. They were first given in 1953, at the 11th World Science Fiction Convention. Kubrick was awarded three times.

!
|-
|1965
|Dr. Strangelove
|rowspan=3|Best Dramatic Presentation
|
| rowspan=3|
|-
|1969
|2001: A Space Odyssey
|
|-
|1972
|A Clockwork Orange
|
|}

Others 

Kubrick received two awards from major film festivals: Best Director from the Locarno International Film Festival in 1959 for Killer's Kiss, and Filmcritica Bastone Bianco Award at the Venice Film Festival in 1999 for Eyes Wide Shut. He also was nominated for the Golden Lion of the Venice Film Festival in 1962 for Lolita. The Venice Film Festival awarded him the Career Golden Lion in 1997. He received the D.W. Griffith Lifetime Achievement Award from the Directors Guild of America, and another life-achievement award from the Director's Guild of Great Britain. Posthumously, the Sitges - Catalan International Film Festival awarded him the Honorary Grand Prize for life achievement in 2008.

|-
| 1955 || Killer's Kiss || Locarno International Film Festival Prize for Best Director || 
|-
|rowspan=2| 1962 ||rowspan=2| Lolita || Directors Guild of America's Award for Outstanding Directing || 
|-
| Golden Lion || 
|-
|rowspan=2| 1971 ||rowspan=2| A Clockwork Orange || New York Film Critics Circle Award for Best Picture || 
|-
| New York Film Critics Circle Award for Best Director || 
|-
|rowspan=2| 1980 ||rowspan=2| The Shining || Saturn Award for Best Director || 
|-
| Golden Raspberry Award for Worst Director || 
|}

References

External links

Stanley Kubrick
Kubrick